Pathrosinte Padappukal is a 2022 Indian Malayalam-language comedy-drama film directed by Afsal Abdul Latheef. The screenplay of the film is written by Dinoy Paulose. The film features Sharaf U Dheen, Grace Antony, Naslen K. Gafoor, Dinoy Paulose and Ranjita Menon.

Plot 
Pathrose who works in a gas agency, has a family consisting of his wife and four children. Tony, who is the second among them is the central character. He is a lazy lad who doesn't do any works and enjoys his life. The eldest son Sony is a traveler and the youngest son Bonnie is a thief. They have one sister named Neenu who is a student. The arrival of Tony's grandmother and the following interesting incidents that revolve around their lives forms the plot of the story. Tony who falls in love with his neighbor girl and best friend Ammu and the intriguing events that occurs as the result adds further twists to the story.

Cast
 Sharaf U Dheen as Sony Pathrose
 Dinoy Paulose as Tony Pathrose
 Naslen K. Gafoor as Boney Pathrose
 Grace Antony as Christeena
 Ranjita Menon as Ammu
 Nandhu as Priest
 James Eliya as Pathrose  
 Shiny Sarah as Jolly
 Suresh Krishna as Satya
 Johny Antony as Kuriakose
 Rahul Reghu
 Shyam Mohan as Arun

References

External links 
 

2020s Malayalam-language films
2022 films
2022 comedy-drama films
Films scored by Jakes Bejoy